Arab Mosque may refer to:
Arap Mosque or Arab Mosque, a mosque in Istanbul
Arab Mosque, any of the mosques in the Arab League

See also
Arab Ahmet Mosque, a mosque in Northern Cyprus
List of mosques